Simone Canestrelli (born 11 September 2000) is an Italian professional footballer who plays as a defender for  club Como on loan from Pisa.

Club career
In July 2019, Canestrelli moved to Serie C club AlbinoLeffe on a free transfer.

On 1 July 2021, Empoli exercised their right to buy Canestrelli back from AlbinoLeffe.

On 27 August 2021, he joined Crotone on loan. On 18 July 2022, Canestrelli was loaned to Pisa. On 30 January 2023, Pisa exercised their option to make Canestrelli's transfer permanent. On the next day, he was loaned by Pisa to Como.

References

External links

2000 births
Living people
Italian footballers
Association football defenders
U.C. AlbinoLeffe players
Empoli F.C. players
F.C. Crotone players
Pisa S.C. players
Como 1907 players
Serie C players
Serie B players